Telephone Herald may refer to:
 The Telefon Hírmondó telephone newspaper service in Budapest, Hungary
 The United States Telephone Herald Company